War Child or Warchild may refer to:

 Child soldiers, children who are used in war, as soldiers or in combat support 
 Military brat, military slang for a child or teenager of a military family
 Refugee, children who are refugees of war
 War children, those born to a native parent and a parent belonging to a foreign military force
 War Child (charity), a Dutch, British and Canadian charity that helps children who are victims of warfare
 Childhood in war
 German childhood in World War II
 Finnish war children, evacuated from Finland to Sweden, Norway or Denmark

Fiction 
 Warchild, a 1982 novel by Richard Bowes
 Warchild (Cartmel novel), a 1996 Doctor Who spin-off novel by Andrew Cartmel
 Warchild (Lowachee novel), a 2002 science fiction novel by Karin Lowachee
 Warchild (Star Trek), a 1994 novel by Esther Friesner
 Warchild (film), a 2006 German-Bosnian film by Christian Wagner

Music 
 War Child (album), a 1974 album by Jethro Tull featuring the song "War Child"
 Warchild (album), a collection of songs by Paul Di'Anno's Battlezone
 "War Child" (song), a 1982 song by American band Blondie
 "War Child", a song by The Cranberries from the album To the Faithful Departed
 The Help Album, a charity album compiled by the War Child charity
 "War Child", a song by Hollywood Undead from the album Day of the Dead

See also
 Joseph Wheeler (1836–1906), American military commander and politician, nicknamed "War Child"
 War baby (disambiguation)
 War Boy (disambiguation)